Music is a public art work by Karl Kahlich located in Monument Park at the Parklawn development of the Housing Authority of the City of Milwaukee, northwest of downtown Milwaukee, Wisconsin. Music is carved from local limestone and depicts a figure in a cap holding a circular instrument on his lap.  The sculpture was installed in 1938 as one of four public artworks based on the theme of leisure activity.

Description
Music is carved from a large block of limestone quarried at nearby Currie Park. The figure's head wears a cap and is turned to the side. He holds a circular instrument on his lap. One hand is in front of the instrument and the other is at his side.

The artwork was commissioned during the federal Works Progress Administration's campaign to put Americans to work by improving local infrastructure under Franklin D. Roosevelt's New Deal. When Milwaukee constructed Parklawn using WPA labor, Karl Kahlich was commissioned to create decorative sculptures for the development's massive park. Kahlich was a participant in the Federal Art Project of the WPA.

Restoration
In 1998, Parklawn underwent a $34 million revitalization and the Housing Authority of the City of Milwaukee decided to restore the sculptures and give them a prominent location in a new common green space called Monument Park. Walkways connect Kahlich's Music and Fishing with a central gazebo, informational plaques, time capsules, a stone war memorial, and other artwork.

See also
List of New Deal sculpture

References

Musical sculptures
Works Progress Administration in Wisconsin
Outdoor sculptures in Milwaukee
1938 establishments in Wisconsin
1938 sculptures
Limestone sculptures in Wisconsin
Sculptures of men in Wisconsin